Real Zaragoza is an association football club based in Zaragoza, Spain, that plays in the Segunda División. The club was formed in 1932 from a merger between Iberia SC and Real Zaragoza CD. It first appeared in La Liga in the 1939–40 season, finishing in 7th position. The team has never won La Liga, but were Segunda División champions in 1977–78. It has had more success in cup competitions, winning the Copa del Rey six times between 1964 and 2004, plus the Supercopa de España in 2004. Real Zaragoza has also made a mark in European competitions, winning the Inter-Cities Fairs Cup (predecessor to the UEFA Europa League) in 1964 and the UEFA Cup Winners' Cup in 1995.

Xavier Aguado holds the record for most overall appearances, having played 473 times between 1990 and 2003. He also has the most league appearances, with 383, ahead of Juan Señor, who has made 304 appearances from 1981 to 1990. Santiago Aragón is third with 303 appearances from 1992 to 2003 for the club. Marcelino is the all-time top scorer with 117. Ewerthon holds the record for the most goals in a season; he scored 28 goals in all competitions during the 2008–09 season. Miguel Pardeza has the most league goals with 76, with Saturnino Arrúa second with 71 goals and Marcelino third with 70 goals.

One of the most famous players to pass through the club was Frank Rijkaard, who played for Real Zaragoza on loan from Sporting CP during the 1987–88 season. He was placed third in the 1988 Ballon d'Or vote, partly based on his performances with Real Zaragoza, as well as those with Milan and the Netherlands national team.

The list includes notable footballers who have played for Real Zaragoza. Generally, this means players that have played at least 100 league games and/or have reached international status.

Key

Players whose name is in italics currently play for the club.
The years are the first and last calendar years in which the player was registered to the club.
Appearances and goals comprise only those in league matches; that is those in La Liga, the Segunda División and the Tercera División.

List of players

Notes
 For a full description of positions see football positions.
Pichichi.Won the Pichichi Trophy while at Real Zaragoza.
A.  Marcelino holds the record for most Real Zaragoza goals, with 117.
B.  Miguel Pardeza holds the record for most Real Zaragoza league goals, with 76.
C.  Gus Poyet holds the record for most Real Zaragoza appearances by a foreign player, with 239.
D.  Xavier Aguado holds the record for most Real Zaragoza appearances, with 473. He has also played the most minutes, with 33,480, and received the most red cards, with 18.
E.  Ewerthon holds the record for most Real Zaragoza goals in a single season, with 28 during 2008–09.

References

 
Real Zaragoza
Players
Association football player non-biographical articles